The Civil Air Patrol Quonset Huts were three Quonset huts located at 16601 Airport Road in Lansing, Michigan, near Capital Region International Airport. The huts were listed on the National Register of Historic Places in 1991, and are part of the Historic American Engineering Record. The huts are missing and presumed demolished.

History
These Quonset hits were manufactured by the Butler Manufacturing Company and shipped to Lansing in 1941. They were set up at this location in November, 1941 to house the newly established 9622nd USAF Reserve Recovery Unit. Soon after, the Civil Air Patrol was established, and the Lansing unit began using the huts. For the remainder of World War II, the Lansing Quonset huts were used as a pilot training facility for both the Civil Air Patrol and the USAF Reserve Recovery Unit. The three huts were used continually after the war until 1958, when they were dismantled and put into storage in response to a perceived military threat to the airport. However, the huts were put back into service in 1963, and were used until at least the early 1990s, despite planned demolition in the 1980s.

However, by 1995, the huts were deemed as airport hazards by the Federal Aviation Administration and vacated. Demolition was scheduled at that time.

Description
The three Quonset huts sat side by side. All three were constructed from prefabricated corrugated steel panels placed horizontally over arched steel ribs and purloins. The huts were eighteen by forty-eight feet, with a center height of eleven feet. Each hut had a single door on the end, and eight windows, four on each side, measuring 31 by 39 inches. The windows were hinged at the top of the frame and open from the bottom.

Gallery

See also

 Capital Region International Airport
 Lansing, Michigan

References

National Register of Historic Places in Eaton County, Michigan
Transportation in Lansing, Michigan